RV Pelican was built in 1985 as an oceanographic research vessel and is operated by the Louisiana Universities Marine Consortium (LUMCON).  The vessel has four laboratories and can support 16 scientists for periods up to three weeks.  In May 2010, it was one of the first scientific vessels to arrive at the site of the Deepwater Horizon oil spill in the Gulf of Mexico to begin the process of characterizing the extent and consequences of the spill.

External links
 RV Pelican

References

Research vessels of the United States
University-National Oceanographic Laboratory System research vessels
1985 ships